The 2001 Nottinghamshire County Council election was held on Thursday, 7 June 2001. The whole council was up for election and the result was the Labour Party retaining its control of the council.

Election result

|}

References

2001
2001 English local elections
2000s in Nottinghamshire
June 2001 events in the United Kingdom